Santa Cruz is a canton in the Ecuadorian province of the Galápagos. Its area covers the islands of Baltra, Bartolomé, Marchena, North Seymour, Pinta, Pinzón, Rábida,  Santa Cruz, and Santiago. As of the 2006 Galápagos census, it has a population of 11,262.

References

Cantons of Galápagos Province